The New York Dance and Performance Awards, also known as the Bessie Awards, are awarded annually for exceptional achievement by independent dance artists presenting their work in New York City. The broad categories of the awards are: choreography, performance, music composition and visual design. The Bessie Awards were established in 1983.

History and description
The Bessie Awards were established in 1983 by Dance Theater Workshop and named in honor of Bessie Schonberg, an influential mid-20th-century teacher of modern dance and former head of the dance department at Sarah Lawrence College.  The awards honor exceptional choreography, performance, music composition and visual design in dance and allied art forms.  Nominees and award winners are chosen by the Bessie Selection Committee, which consists of dancers, dance presenters, producers, choreographers, journalists, critics and academics.

Since 2010, the awards have been overseen by an independent steering committee in partnership with Dance/NYC and administered by Lucy Sexton.  In their current iteration, the awards encompass a broader range of dance genres and supporting art forms than in the past, and offer an annual commission to an emerging artist.

Recipients
Over 400 Bessie Awards have been presented since their founding. Notable recipients include:

Choreographers

Arthur Aviles
 Jérôme Bel
 Beverly Schmidt Blossom
 Camille A. Brown
 Trisha Brown
 Donald Byrd
 Ann Carlson
 Ping Chong
 Yoshiko Chuma
 Leslie Cuyjet 
 Garth Fagan
 Molissa Fenley
 William Forsythe
 Beth Gill
 Guillermo Gómez-Peña
 David Gordon
 Bill Irwin
 Bill T. Jones
 Lisa Jones
 Carl Hancock Rux
 Anne Teresa de Keersmaeker
 Alonzo King
 Stephan Koplowitz
 Édouard Lock
 Meredith Monk
 Mark Morris
 Tere O'Connor
 Stephen Petronio
 Inbal Pinto
 Joya Powell
 Angelin Preljocaj
 David Roussève
 Pam Tanowitz
 Raúl Tamez
 Saburo Teshigawara
 Muna Tseng
 Doug Varone
 Johanna Boyce
 Jawole Willa Jo Zollar
 Robert Wilson
 Christopher Williams
 Mariana Valencia
 Wim Vandekeybus

Composers

David Byrne
 James Baker
 Anthony Davis
 Peter Laurence Gordon
 Julius Hemphill
 Lenny Pickett
 Dan Siegler
 Hahn Rowe
 David Van Tieghem

Designers

Charles Atlas
 Powers Boothe
 Kyle Chepulis
 Beverly Emmons
 David Ferri
 Kathryn Kaufmann
 Peter Ksander
 Mark Lancaster
 Susanne Poulin
 Stan Pressner
 Philip Sandström
 Howard S. Thies
 Jennifer Tipton
 Philip Trevino
Casper Stracke & Benton C Bainbridge

An archive of past recipients is available at the Bessies web site.

References

External links
 The Bessie Awards Web site

Dance awards
Dance in the United States
Dance in New York City
 
Awards established in 1983
1983 establishments in New York City